Carabus longeantennatus is a species of ground beetle in the genus Carabus, first described by Hauser in 1931.

Subspecies 
 Carabus longeantennatus acorep Lassalle & Prunier, 1993
 Carabus longeantennatus angulihabitus Kleinfeld, 1998
 Carabus longeantennatus changyangensis Kleinfeld, 1998
 Carabus longeantennatus leigongensis Deuve, 1994
 Carabus longeantennatus longeantennatus Hauser, 1931
 Carabus longeantennatus qianxiensis Deuve, 2002
 Carabus longeantennatus satoi (Imura, 2003)
 Carabus longeantennatus yongshan Kleinfeld, 1999

References 

Insects described in 1931
longeantennatus
Insects of China